The R312 road is a regional road in northwest County Mayo in Ireland.

The government legislation that defines the R312, the Roads Act 1993 (Classification of Regional Roads) Order 2012 (Statutory Instrument 54 of 2012), provides the following official description:

Castlebar — Bellacorick, County Mayo

Between its junction with R311 at Derrycoosh and its junction with N59 at Moneynierin via Tawnyeeny, Glenisland, Beltra, Boggy, Boghadoon, Keenagh Cross and Doiry Cross all in the county of Mayo.

See also
List of roads of County Mayo
National primary road
National secondary road
Regional road
Roads in Ireland

References

Regional roads in the Republic of Ireland
Roads in County Mayo